Ignazio Corrao (born 14 January 1984) is an Italian politician for the Five Star Movement and he is a member of the European Parliament since 2014. Corrao was born in Rome and grew up in Alcamo, Sicily.

Education and career
He consecuted law degree from the University of Palermo and qualified as a lawyer at the Italian Court of Appeal. In the 2014 European Parliament election he was elected to the European Parliament in the Italian Islands (European Parliament constituency), getting the highest number of preference votes among the Five Star Movement candidates.
 
In June, he was elected the first leader of the Five Star Movement's group in Parliament, becoming one of the youngest representatives to get this role in the European Union.
Considered one of first political exponents of the Erasmus generation, he has gained various experiences of work, study and volunteering abroad at a very young age.

In December 2020, he joined the Greens/EFA group together with his colleagues Rosa D'Amato, Eleonora Evi and Piernicola Pedicini.

References

External links 

https://web.archive.org/web/20160308051557/http://www.beppegrillo.it/movimento/parlamentoeuropeo/materiali/ignaziocorrao_M5S_letteradipresentazione.pdf
http://elezionistorico.interno.it/
http://www.lastampa.it/2014/06/10/italia/politica/il-grillino-a-bruxelles-con-zaino-e-autostop-wEnxe11F9uW8YJEFTbWPjM/premium.html
http://video.repubblica.it/dossier/movimento-5-stelle-beppe-grillo/corrao-da-alcamo-a-bruxelles-il-5stelle-che-viaggia-in-autostop/168809/167288
http://www.blogsicilia.it/tag/ignazio-corrao-autostop/
http://www.lastampa.it/2014/07/02/italia/politica/per-il-bene-dellitalia-noi-cinque-stelle-dobbiamo-dialogare-con-tutti-i-partiti-b2RkbxB3gUH0jljMyVc9cO/pagina.html?wtrk=cpc.social.Facebook
European Parliament (homesite)

1984 births
Living people
People from Alcamo
Five Star Movement MEPs
Five Star Movement politicians
21st-century Italian politicians
MEPs for Italy 2014–2019
MEPs for Italy 2019–2024